In the Garden of Venus is the sixth studio album by German duo Modern Talking, released on 30 November 1987 by Hansa Records. Due to lack of promotion, the album failed to match the commercial success of the duo's previous releases. In the Garden of Venus is also the last album before Modern Talking's first official separation in 1987; the duo, however, reunited in 1998 and released the comeback album Back for Good. The album's only single, "In 100 Years...", charted at number 30 in Germany.

Track listing

Personnel
 Dieter Bohlen – production, arrangements
 Luis Rodríguez – co-production
 Don Landwehrle – front cover photo
 Dieter Zill – artists photo

Charts

Certifications

References

1987 albums
Hansa Records albums
Modern Talking albums